Gordon Pogoda is an American composer, lyricist, and producer based in Los Angeles. In 2018, he signed a publishing deal with BMG Music. Previously, he had publishing deals with EMI Music, Universal Music and Warner Chappell Music.

Biography
Pogoda earned a B.S. in chemical engineering from the University of Massachusetts-Amherst. After working for a few years at an engineering firm, he decided to leave his engineering career behind and pursue his lifelong dream of songwriting, which he began at age 15 (he began playing piano at age 13.)

Pogoda has had songs featured in several media. In film, he had two songs featured in the Academy Award-winning picture Little Miss Sunshine, one in the film Josie and the Pussycats, one in the Disney film Get a Clue and several others. In television, Pogoda's songs have been featured in Hannah Montana with "If Cupid Had a Heart", and Sex and the City, CSI: Miami, ER, Will and Grace, King of the Hill, Samantha Who and Medium. Due to all his success in television and film, three albums of all Gordon Pogoda songs were released digitally. One is titled "Gordon Pogoda Songs From Film & TV", a 13-song various-artist set including "If Cupid Had a Heart" (featured in 17 TV shows and films such as Hannah Montana and Little Miss Sunshine). The second album is titled "If Cupid Had a Heart" and features all songs performed by guest vocalist Julie Griffin. And his latest album is called "The Indie Pop Collection".

Pogoda most recently had a #1 song on the UK iTunes Vocal Songs chart - "Dancing in the Driver's Seat" by Sonia, and also a song on a #8 album in the UK - the song "Beautiful Battlefield" by Steps on their album Tears on the Dancefloor: Crying at the Disco. His remix of "Beautiful Battlefield" (subtitled "Gordon Pogoda Dance Remix") is featured on Steps' 4-CD boxed set "Singles Collection", out July 27, 2018, as the closing song. He also wrote two songs recorded by European Pop Idol winner Patrick Jurdić, and had the number two song of the year in Russia for pop/rock artist Sergey Lazarev, and a top 5 hit for Tereza Kerndlová in the Czech Republic, which was selected to represent the Czech Republic in the 2008 Eurovision Song Contest. A song "I Wish I Could Pretend" written in collaboration with the Latvian composer Lauris Reiniks came in second place to represent Ireland in the 2009 Eurovision Song Contest. He had a platinum record with the Australian group Scandal'us, three platinum and gold records with the Greek group Hi-5, and a platinum record for Finnish girl band Tiktak. In the United States, Pogoda wrote a top 10 hit on the U.S. Contemporary Christian singles chart for sister group Aurora, and a single for Natalie Grant. Pogoda has also had songs used for Disney films, CDs, TV shows & DVDs.

Songs in notable films and television shows

Songs on notable albums

References 
 Official Gordon Pogoda website, Gordon Pogoda website

External links 
  Official Gordon Pogoda website
 Gordon Pogoda Interview for SongLink International
 Gordon Pogoda Interview for Pitch Music Center
 Gordon Pogoda Interview for Eurovision Song Contest Today
 Gordon Pogoda Interview for MyHitOnline

Living people
American male composers
21st-century American composers
American male songwriters
21st-century American male musicians
Year of birth missing (living people)